"Perdiendo la Cabeza" is a song by Mexican singer Carlos Rivera, American singer Becky G and Puerto Rican singer Pedro Capó. The song and its music video was released by Sony Music Latin on January 30, 2020, as the first single from Rivera's seventh album, Crónicas de una Guerra (2021).

Live performances
Rivera, Gomez and Capó performed "Perdiendo la Cabeza" together for the first time at the Premio Lo Nuestro 2020 on February 20, 2020.

Charts

Certifications

References

2020 singles
2020 songs
Sony Music Latin singles
Becky G songs
Pedro Capó songs
Spanish-language songs
Songs written by Andrés Torres (producer)
Songs written by Mauricio Rengifo